Isaiah 9 is the ninth chapter of the Book of Isaiah in the Hebrew Bible or the Old Testament of the Christian Bible. This book contains the prophecies attributed to the prophet Isaiah, and is one of the Nevi'im.

Text 
The original text was written in Hebrew language. This chapter is divided into 21 verses in Christian Bibles, but 20 verses in the Hebrew Bible with the following verse numbering comparison:

This article generally follows the common numbering in Christian English Bible versions, with notes to the numbering in Hebrew Bible versions.

Textual witnesses
Some early manuscripts containing the text of this chapter in Hebrew are of the Masoretic Text tradition, which includes the Codex Cairensis (895), the Petersburg Codex of the Prophets (916), Aleppo Codex (10th century), Codex Leningradensis (1008).

Fragments containing parts of this chapter were found among the Dead Sea Scrolls (3rd century BC or later):
 1QIsaa: complete
 4QIsab (4Q56): extant: verses 10‑11
 4QIsac (4Q57): extant: verses 3‑12
 4QIsae (4Q59): extant: verses 17‑20

There is also a translation into Koine Greek known as the Septuagint, made in the last few centuries BCE. Extant ancient manuscripts of the Septuagint version include Codex Vaticanus (B; B; 4th century), Codex Sinaiticus (S; BHK: S; 4th century), Codex Alexandrinus (A; A; 5th century) and Codex Marchalianus (Q; Q; 6th century).

Parashot
The parashah sections listed here are based on the Aleppo Codex. Isaiah 9 is a part of the Prophecies about Judah and Israel (Isaiah 1-12). {P}: open parashah; {S}: closed parashah; using Hebrew Bible verse numbering:
 [{S} 8:19-23] 9:1-6 {P} 9:7-12 {S} 9:13-20 {S}

The government of the promised son (9:1–7)

Verse 1

Christian interpretation

The Gospel of Matthew chapter 4 (verses 14–15) cites this and the next verse as a fulfillment of Messianic Prophecies of Jesus. In the Greek "by way of the sea" (or "toward the sea") refers to a specific route, and Jones feels it should perhaps be more accurately read as "on the road to the sea." In Isaiah this verse is in the section describing the Assyrian invasion of northern Israel, so "toward the sea, beyond the Jordan" refers to the geography from the view point of the Assyrian invaders. To them the region of Zebulun and Naphtali would be across the Jordan River on the way to the Mediterranean.

Verse 2

Christian interpretation 
Cross reference: Matthew 4:16

Verse 6

Jewish interpretation
Edersheim (1883) notes that this verse is applied to the Messiah in the Aramaic Targum. In rabbinical interpretation, such as Joseph Herman Hertz (1968) citing Rashi and Luzzatto, the name is taken as referring to the 'crown prince.' Rashi, having applied Emmanuel to Hezekiah also applies the Pele Yoez, "Wonderful Counsellor" prophecy to Hezekiah, saying that God "called the name of Hezekiah "Prince of Peace"." In the Greek Septuagint the name is translated, "Messenger of Great Counsel" as a description of the prince: "he shall be named Messenger of Great Counsel, for I will bring peace upon the rulers, peace and health to him."

Christian interpretation

  

 "Wonderful Counselor": ; .
 "Mighty God": Isaiah 10:21.
 "Everlasting Father": The New Oxford Annotated Bible interprets it "God as the eternal creator" .
 "Prince of Peace": According to the New Oxford Annotated Bible, it is "a messianic title in Judaism and early Christianity".
 "Messenger of great counsel": is translated as "Angel of the great Council" in The Apostolic Constitutions.  

In Christian interpretation, based partly on the proximity of a quote of Isaiah 9:2 found in Matthew 4, the name is taken as referring to Jesus and Messianic prophecy. The full verse "For unto us a child is born, unto us a son is given: and the government shall be upon his shoulder: and his name shall be called Wonderful, Counselor, The mighty God, The everlasting Father, The Prince of Peace." is quoted in the libretto of Handel's Messiah.

Verse 7

The punishment of Samaria (9:8–21)

Verse 12
The Syrians before, and the Philistines behind;
and they shall devour Israel with open mouth.
For all this his anger is not turned away,
but his hand is stretched out still.
The refrain "For all this ... still" first appeared in Isaiah 5:25 and also appears here as well as in 9:17, 9:21 and 10:4.

Verse 14

 Therefore the Lord will cut off from Israel head and tail,
 branch and rush, in one day.
Cross reference: Isaiah 19:15
This verse uses a metaphor of 'a reed being cut down'.

Verse 15
 The elder and honorable, he is the head;
 The prophet who teaches lies, he is the tail.
"Honorable": in Hebrew literally "the one lifted up with respect to the face" (cf. 2 Kings 5:1).

Verse 16
 For the leaders of this people cause them to err,
 And those who are led by them are destroyed.
"And those who are led by them are destroyed": in Hebrew literally "and the ones being led were swallowed up.”

Verse 17
Therefore the Lord will have no joy in their young men,
Nor have mercy on their fatherless and widows;
For everyone is a hypocrite and an evildoer,
And every mouth speaks folly.
For all this His anger is not turned away,
But His hand is stretched out still.
"Speaks folly": that is, "speaks foolishness" or "speaks disgraceful things"
The refrain "For all this ... still" first appeared in Isaiah 5:25 and also appears here as well as in 9:12, 9:21 and 10:4.

Verse 21
Manasseh, Ephraim; and Ephraim, Manasseh:
'a'nd they together shall be against Judah.For all this his anger is not turned away,but his hand is stretched out still.''
The refrain "For all this ... still" first appeared in Isaiah 5:25 and also appears here as well as in 9:12, 9:17 and 10:4.

Uses

Music
The King James Version of verses 2 and 6 from this chapter is cited as texts in the English-language oratorio "Messiah" by George Frideric Handel (HWV 56).

See also
Galilee
Jewish messianism
Messianic prophecies of Jesus
Related Bible parts: Isaiah 7, Isaiah 8, Isaiah 19, Jeremiah 23, Matthew 4

Notes and references

Sources

External links

Jewish
Isaiah 9:Original Hebrew with Parallel English

Christian
Isaiah 9 English Translation with Parallel Latin Vulgate

09